Irène Souka (born 1953 or 1954) is a retired European civil servant from Greece, from 2009 to January 2020 Director General of the Directorate-General for Human Resources and Security of the European Commission.

Biography
Irène Souka graduated in law from 1971 to 1976 at the National and Kapodistrian University of Athens. Additional studies in criminology at the University of Cambridge (1976 to 1977) and international law at the Vrije Universiteit Brussel (1977 to 1978) followed.

Souka joined the European Commission in 1980, initially in the Directorate-General for Translation as team leader in the Greek division. She moved to the Directorate-General for Competition in 1990, as assistant to the Director General, and then from 1994 as head of unit. From 2000 she worked in the Directorate General for Personnel and Administration as Head of Unit, Director (2002), Deputy Director-General (2008), and finally Director-General (May 2009).

During her career as Director-General, she is reported to have resisted various attempts at modernisation of the European civil service, including the establishment in 2002 of the European Personnel Selection Office upon the initiative of Commissioner Neil Kinnock. 

Her position as Director-General, as well as that of her husband Dominique Ristori, were extended in February 2018 with unanimous decision of the College of Commissioners, since both had passed the retirement age of 65. At the same meeting, the Commissioners appointed Martin Selmayr to the post of Deputy Secretary-General and then directly of Secretary-General of the European Commission. Selmayr's appointment procedure was later condemned by both the European Parliament and the European Ombudsman, which concluded that the Consultative Committee on Appointments that evaluates and shortlisted candidates for senior Commission jobs — of which Souka was a permanent member as Director general of human resources — had not followed its own rules of procedure, including by not publishing the vacancy for the posts.

Together with Selmayr, she is reported to have stopped the mandatory rotation policy for high-level EU civil servants every five to seven years, remaining herself in the top position for 11 years, while extending the same policy to middle management. At the same time, she was pivotal in managing the shift of the European Commission towards reaching the target of 40% of women in management by 2020.

In 2019 Souka was confirmed as Director-General by the new Commissioner for Budget and Human Resources, Johannes Hahn, and prolonged until 31 January 2020. She retired on that date, after complaining to the cabinet of Commission President Ursula von der Leyen that she had received no information about the further extension of her employment with the Commission.

References

External links 
 
 Politico Europe (EN)

Greek people
European civil servants
1950s births
Living people
National and Kapodistrian University of Athens alumni